The Golden Sunlight mine is an open pit gold mine in Jefferson County, Montana,  northeast of Whitehall and  east of Butte, Montana.

Owned and operated by Barrick Gold, the mine has been in operation since 1975, and in 2016 produced  of gold.

Golden Sunlight is a conventional open-pit mine with a co-located ore treatment plant using carbon-in-pulp technology as well as sand tailings retreatment, where pyrite is gravity-separated from the cyclone underflow fraction, and reground and leached to recover gold that would otherwise be lost to tailings. In total mine operations employ approximately 150 people.

References

Barrick Gold
Gold mines in the United States
Buildings and structures in Jefferson County, Montana
Mines in Montana